Indraprastha Institute of Information Technology, Delhi (Iṃdraprastha Sūcanā Praudyōgikī Saṃsthān Dillī, IIIT-Delhi or IIIT-D) is an autonomous State University located in Delhi, India. It is a research-oriented institute with a focus on Computer Science and allied areas. IIIT delhi offers B.Tech,M.Tech and Ph.D degrees.

History
IIIT-D started at the Netaji Subhas University of Technology (NSUT) campus at Sector 3, Dwarka, New Delhi. It was founded as a State University by an act of the Delhi Government (The IIIT Delhi Act, 2007) in 2008, with seed support from the Government of NCT of Delhi. The institute began with its first batch of 60 students on 8 September 2008 from NSUT (NSIT at that time). IIIT-Delhi moved to its current permanent campus in August 2012. The campus was inaugurated by Sheila Dikshit, former Chief Minister of Delhi, in October 2012.
The university is accredited an ‘A’ grade by NAAC (National Assessment and Accreditation Council), and has been accorded 12-B status by the University Grants Commission (UGC).
IIIT-Delhi is an autonomous university, with the board fully authorized to take important decisions of its own volition.

Campus

IIIT Delhi operates from its campus in Okhla Industrial Estate, Phase III, New Delhi. Its campus is spread over 25 acres.

The campus consists of an academic complex, a library and information center, a dining and recreation centre, and hostels.

Phase 2 Development
Arvind Kejriwal, the Chief Minister of Delhi inaugurated Phase-II of the campus on 21 August 2018. New Academic Block, Lecture Hall Block, Residential (Faculty Residence) Block, Hostel Block H1, Hostel Block H2, and Sports Block are built in the campus and collectively called Phase II. The eight-storey R&D Block which includes 4 hundred-seater lecture halls, 58 labs, 24 discussion rooms, 7 meeting rooms, 116 faculty rooms and office spaces has been operational since August 2017. 
The 11-storeyed Hostel Block H1 which has 21 married accommodation facility and 197 double-seater rooms has been functional since February 2018. 
The Residential faculty has 12 stories with 44 flats, which are occupied since March 2018. The six-storey Lecture Hall Block with one 500-seater and two 300-seater lecture theaters, classrooms and instructions labs became functional in August 2018. 
The newly built sports block is equipped with various facilities such as a badminton court, a heated indoor swimming pool, table tennis tables, a gym, a yoga room, and 2 squash rooms. The institute also has a multi-purpose sports field, two tennis courts, a basketball court, and a volleyball field. The Phase II expansion of IIIT-D is estimated to enhance its student uptake from over 1,800 in 2015 to 3,000.

Organisation and administration

Funding
The land and infrastructure of IIIT-D is funded by the Government of Delhi.
A grant of Rs 4,21,00,000 (4CR) has been earmarked for the development of the IIIT-D Innovation & Incubation Center by the Department of Science of Technology, Government of India.
The university reported an expenditure of Rs '58,79,45,226'(58CR) in the financial year of 2018-2019.

Governance
IIIT-Delhi was established by the Government of Delhi in 2008 as per the IIIT-Delhi Act. The IIIT-Delhi Act ensures administrative and academic autonomy. The General Council is the highest body overseeing the institute, and advises the Vice-Chancellor. The Chancellor of the Institute is the Lt. Governor of Delhi, who also chairs the General Council of the Institute. The Board of Governors consists of the Director, the Chairman, four experts, two government nominees and two professors. The Board decides the salaries, the number of positions and selects the four experts. The Senate and Board can start degrees/programs. The Senate is empowered to take all academic decisions. The Institute's operational head is the Director. Overall policy making and governance rests with the Board of Governors (BOG).

B.Tech Programs
The institute has the following B.Tech programs: 
 Computer Science and Artificial Intelligence
 Computer Science and Engineering
 Computer Science and Applied Mathematics
 Computer Science and Design
 Computer Science and Biosciences
Computer Science and Social Sciences
 Electronics and Communications Engineering
 Electronics and VLSI Engineering

M.Tech Programs 
The institute has the following M.Tech programs: 
 Computer Science Engineering
Computer Science Engineering with specialization in Artificial Intelligence
Computer Science Engineering with specialization in Data Engineering
Computer Science Engineering with specialization in Information Security
Computer Science Engineering with specialization in Mobile Computing
Electronics and Communications Engineering
Electronics and Communications Engineering with specialization in VLSI & Embedded Systems
Electronics and Communications Engineering with specialization in Cyber-Physical Systems
Electronics and Communications Engineering with specialization in Machine Learning
Computational Biology

Departments
IIIT-D offers an undergraduate B.Tech, a postgraduate M.Tech, and a Ph.D in various fields.

The institute has the following academic departments:
 Department of Computer Science & Engineering
 Department of Electronics and Communications Engineering
 Department of Mathematics
 Department of and Social Sciences and Humanities
 Department of Computational Biology
 Department of Human-Centered Design

The University partnered with Infosys in 2016 to establish the 'Infosys Centre For AI'.

Academics

Admission
The B.Tech admissions to various programs of IIIT-D are done through Joint Admission Counselling Delhi (JAC Delhi) together with Indira Gandhi Delhi Technological University for Women, Delhi Technological University, Netaji Subhash University of Technology and Delhi Skill and Entrepreneurship University on the basis of JEE Main rank.

B.Tech admission to Computer Science and Design (CSD) program can also be done through IIIT-D's direct admission process using UCEED rank. Some seats of the CSD program are reserved for direct admission process using the UCEED rank as of 2021.

B.Tech admission to Computer Science and Social Sciences (CSSS) program can also be done on the basis of class XII marks (with Mathematics being a mandatory subject in class XII). Some seats of the CSSS program are reserved for direct admission using this process as of 2021.

Candidates availing direct admission to the CSD & CSSS programs must be from NCT of Delhi.

B.Tech admission of foreign nationals/OCIs/POIs/NRIs is done through DASA.

For M.Tech admissions, both GATE score and B.Tech CGPA/percentage are considered for shortlisting purposes. Final merit list is obtained after a coding test and interview of shortlisted students at IIIT-Delhi campus.

Rankings

Internationally, IIIT-Delhi was ranked 351–400 in Asia on the QS World University Rankings of 2023. It was ranked 601–800 in the world by the Times Higher Education World University Rankings of 2023, 177 in Asia in 2022 and 188 among emerging economies.

In India, IIIT-Delhi was ranked 56 among engineering institutes by National Institutional Ranking Framework (NIRF) in 2020.

IIITD was ranked 14th among engineering institutions in India in 2020 by India Today.

Library
The Library and Information Center of the Institute is housed in a separate building and is automated with the help of RFID Technology with EM security. The library is on the first floor and has a large collection of print and electronic media in areas including Computer Science, Electronics and Communications, Mathematics and Statistics, Humanities and Sciences. A common study area for students is on the ground floor and several labs are on the upper floors. As of 2019, the library contains 10000+ books, 10000+ Ebooks and 700+ Kindles. There is also a reading room facility open 24 hours per day.

Faculty 
IIIT-D has 88 regular faculty members and 16 visiting faculty members.

All regular faculty members have a Ph.D. Degree from reputed universities across the globe. 55% of the faculty members have done their Ph.D. Degree from abroad.

Out of the 104 faculty members, 79 are male and 25 are female.

The CSE & ECE departments alone have approximately 50% of the working faculty strength.

Student life
The Dining and Recreation Centre of the institute contains a students' mess, which is spread over two floors, a cafeteria and facilities for extra co-curricular activities, such as a dance room, music room and a gymnasium.

Student council
Student Council is a main elected student's body which supervises all clubs and festivals. It has a budget which the council distributes to various clubs. Students can form new clubs, based on interests, after formal permission of the student council. The Student Senate is an elected student's body, which focuses on academic many issues like hostels and mess Committee governance are a main part of the units.

Student festivals
IIIT-D holds two annual festivals, a technical festival called Esya and a cultural one called Odyssey.

IIIT Delhi's Odyssey is the cultural fest of the university. Odyssey was first held at the institute's permanent campus in 2014. It was culminated with over 45 events and a footfall of 25,000+ in the month of January 2020. Past performers of the fest include Jubin Nautiyal, Prateek Kuhad, Gajendra Verma, Hardy Sandhu, The Local Train, Euphoria, Zakir Khan, Bhuvan Bam, Salim-Sulaiman.
Esya is a two-day festival which was first held at the institute's transit campus on 3–4 September 2011. ESYA is IIIT Delhi’s annual tech fest. ESYA provides coders and tech enthusiasts a platform to showcase their ideas and build upon them.

References

External links

2008 establishments in Delhi
Educational institutions established in 2008
Research institutes in Delhi
Engineering colleges in Delhi
Universities and colleges in Delhi
Research institutes established in 2008